This article presents a list of the historical events and publications of Australian literature during 1940.

For an overview of Australian literature see List of years in Australian_literature

Events 
 Meanjin magazine publishes its first issue in Brisbane.

Books 

 Martin Boyd – Nuns in Jeopardy
 Dulcie Deamer – Holiday
 Arthur Gask
 The House on the Fens
 The Tragedy of the Silver Moon
 Michael Innes
 The Secret Vanguard
 There Came Both Mist and Snow
 Nevil Shute
 Landfall: A Channel Story
 An Old Captivity
 Helen Simpson – Maid No More
 Christina Stead – The Man Who Loved Children
 Arthur Upfield – Bushranger of the Skies

Children's 

 Mary Grant Bruce – Peter & Co.
 May Gibbs – The Complete Adventures of Snugglepot and Cuddlepie
 P. L. Travers – Happy Ever After
 Dorothy Wall – Blinky Bill Joins the Army

Poetry 

 Mary Gilmore – "No Foe Shall Gather Our Harvest"
 Max Harris – The Gift of Blood
 Eve Langley – "Native-Born"
 Ian Mudie – Corroboree to the Sun
 Roderic Quinn – "Tyrrell's Bookshop"
 Kenneth Slessor – "Metempsychosis"
 Douglas Stewart – Elegy for an Airman

Awards and honours

Literary

Births 

A list, ordered by date of birth (and, if the date is either unspecified or repeated, ordered alphabetically by surname) of births in 1940 of Australian literary figures, authors of written works or literature-related individuals follows, including year of death.

 9 February – J. M. Coetzee, novelist
 19 March – Andrew Taylor, poet
 12 April – Jack Hibberd, playwright and novelist
 16 April – Marion Halligan, novelist
 28 July – Geoffrey Lehmann, poet and writer for children
 7 July – Geoff Page, poet
 18 August – Jan Owen, poet
 11 November – Jill Roe, historian (died 2017)
 16 November – Craig Powell, poet (died 2022)

Unknown date
 Carmel Bird, novelist
 Rosaleen Love, critic and short story writer
 Ron Pretty, poet

Deaths 

A list, ordered by date of death (and, if the date is either unspecified or repeated, ordered alphabetically by surname) of deaths in 1940 of Australian literary figures, authors of written works or literature-related individuals follows, including year of birth.

 27 March – K. Langloh Parker, author (born 1856)
 3 May – S. Elliott Napier, poet and journalist (born 1870)

See also 
 1940 in poetry
 List of years in literature
 List of years in Australian literature
1940 in literature
1939 in Australian literature
1940 in Australia
1941 in Australian literature

References

Literature
Australian literature by year
20th-century Australian literature
1940 in literature